Parapercis aurantiaca is a fish species in the sandperch family, Pinguipedidae. It is found in the Northwest Pacific, including China, Japan, Taiwan and South Korea.

References

Masuda, H., K. Amaoka, C. Araga, T. Uyeno and T. Yoshino, 1984. The fishes of the Japanese Archipelago. Vol. 1. Tokai University Press, Tokyo, Japan. 437 p. (text).

Taxa named by Ludwig Heinrich Philipp Döderlein
Pinguipedidae
Fish described in 1884
Fish of the North Pacific